The Greensboro Swarm are an American basketball team of the NBA G League based in Greensboro, North Carolina, and are affiliated with the Charlotte Hornets. The Swarm play their home games at the Greensboro Coliseum Fieldhouse. The team became the eleventh Development League team to be owned by an NBA team when it was announced in 2015.

History
In May 2015, the Charlotte Hornets announced that they planned to bring an NBA D-League team to the Carolinas in 2016. After considering several cities and arenas, the Hornets settled on Greensboro, North Carolina, with its home to be at the Pavilion at the Greensboro Coliseum Complex. On December 29, the name and logo of the Swarm was unveiled during an intermission between the women's and men's championship games of the 40th anniversary of HAECO Invitational presented by NewBridge Bank at the Greensboro Coliseum Complex Special Events Center and featured Charlotte Hornets players and executives, Hugo the Hornet, the Honey Bees (cheerleading for the Hornets), Swarm Squad, and special guests.

On July 25, 2016, the Charlotte Hornets hired Denver Nuggets assistant Noel Gillespie to be the head coach of the Swarm. After two seasons and no appearances in the playoffs, Gillespie's contract was not renewed and he was replaced by Joe Wolf.

Hornets' assistant coach Jay Hernandez was named the head coach of the Swarm for the abbreviated 2020–21 bubble season in Orlando. Hornets' head video coordinator Jordan Surenkamp was then named the head coach for the 2021–22 season.

Season-by-season

Current roster

Head coaches

NBA affiliates
Charlotte Hornets (2016–present)

References

External links
 

 
Basketball in Greensboro, North Carolina
Basketball teams established in 2015
Basketball teams in North Carolina
2015 establishments in North Carolina